Alfred O. Adams (January 10, 1897 – October 25, 1989) was an American politician in the state of Washington. He served in the Washington House of Representatives from 1953 to 1969 for District 6.

References

1963 deaths
1897 births
People from Paola, Kansas
Republican Party members of the Washington House of Representatives